Guelassiognon Sylvain Gbohouo (born 29 October 1988) is an Ivorian professional footballer who plays as a goalkeeper for Ethiopian Premier League club Wolkite City and the Ivory Coast national team.

International career

Gbohouo made his debut for the Ivory Coast national team on 6 July 2013, in a 4–1 loss against Nigeria at the 2014 African Nations Championship qualification.

He was part of the team that played in the 2014 FIFA World Cup, but did not make an appearance.

He was Ivory Coast's starting goalkeeper at the 2015 Africa Cup of Nations as they went all the way to the final, but a thigh injury sustained in the semi-final against DR Congo saw him miss out the final match in favour of veteran Boubacar Barry. He was still named the tournament's best goalkeeper, and since Barry's retirement, Gbohouo has been the Elephants' undisputed number one.

During the 2019 Africa Cup of Nations between Côte d'Ivoire and Algeria in the quarter-finals, Sylvain Gbohouo was elected man of the match, despite the defeat of his team on penalties.

Gbohouo could not participate in the 2021 Africa Cup of Nations due to a positive drug test.

Career statistics

International

Honours
Séwé Sport
 Côte d'Ivoire Premier Division: 2012–13, 2013–14
 Coupe Houphouët-Boigny: 2012, 2013, 2014

Mazembe
 Linafoot: 2015–16, 2016–17, 2018–19
 DR Congo Super Cup: 2016
 CAF Champions League: 2015
 CAF Confederation Cup: 2016, 2017
 CAF Super Cup: 2016

Ivory Coast
 Africa Cup of Nations: 2015

Individual
 Africa Cup of Nations Team of the Tournament: 2015

References

External links
 
 

1988 births
Living people
People from Comoé District
Ivorian footballers
Association football goalkeepers
Ivory Coast international footballers
Séwé Sport de San-Pédro players
TP Mazembe players
Africa Cup of Nations-winning players
2014 FIFA World Cup players
2015 Africa Cup of Nations players
2017 Africa Cup of Nations players
2019 Africa Cup of Nations players
Ivorian expatriate footballers
Ivorian expatriate sportspeople in the Democratic Republic of the Congo
Expatriate footballers in the Democratic Republic of the Congo